Bharat24 is a national news channel based in Noida, India. 
The channel, with bureaus in all major states throughout India with a team of more than four thousand reporters on field, was launched on 15 August by Anurag Thakur, India's Information & Broadcasting Minister.

References

External links
 

Hindi-language television channels in India
Television channels and stations established in 2022
Hindi-language television stations
Television stations in India
Television channels based in Noida